Edith Frances Ruth Bradley Holmes (November 26, 1924 – September 2, 2021) was an American linguist, educator, and polyglot who authored two Cherokee language textbooks. Holmes served on the Oklahoma State Regents for Higher Education from 1975 to 1985. She taught Russian language at Louisiana State University and Russian and Cherokee language adult education courses in Bartlesville, Oklahoma.

Early life 
Edith Frances Ruth Bradley was born on November 26, 1924, in Beijing to Edith Louise Grierson and Hugh Wise Bradley. She had a brother, Ian Henri Cairns Bradley. Her father was commissioner of the Chinese Maritime Customs Service. She was raised in China before moving to California in 1938. Holmes graduated from the Dominican Convent School. She earned a B.A. in Slavic languages from the University of California, Berkeley. Holmes, a polyglot, was fluent in English, Russian, Portuguese, and French and proficient in German, Greek, Latin, and Spanish.

Career 
Holmes was a Russian translator at the United Nations Conference on International Organization. She taught Russian at Louisiana State University (LSU), TRW Reda Pump, and Phillips Petroleum Company. In 1947, Holmes studied English language at LSU. In the late 1960s, she became interested in the indigenous languages of the Americas, especially Cherokee. In 1971, she took an economic geography of Russia course at the Middlebury College Language Schools. In the summer of 1976, Holmes studied 17th-century philosophy at the University of Oxford. She was a Cherokee and Russian teacher of adult education courses in Bartlesville, Oklahoma. Betty Sharp Smith, a Cherokee, assisted her in lesson planning for a Cherokee language adult education course she taught. The pair published their materials as a textbook.

Personal life 
During World War II, Holmes met her husband Clifford Holmes while he was a patient at the hospital in Santa Cruz, California, where she and her mother were volunteering. They married in Santa Cruz in 1945. They moved frequently for his job. In 1959, they moved from Salt Lake City to Bartlesville, Oklahoma. She had seven children. Holmes was a member of the American Association of University Women and the Kappa Alpha Theta Alumnus Club. She was president of the Washington County Democratic Women's Club and campaign manager of Washington County for Governor, David Boren. Boren appointed Holmes on the Oklahoma State Regents for Higher Education from 1976 to 1985. She chaired the board from 1981 to 1982.

Holmes died on September 2, 2021, in Bartlesville, Oklahoma.

Selected works

References 

1924 births
2021 deaths
20th-century American women writers
21st-century American women writers
American women academics
Linguists from the United States
20th-century linguists
21st-century linguists
Oklahoma Democrats
University of California, Berkeley alumni
Louisiana State University faculty
Writers from Oklahoma
Multilingual writers
People from Bartlesville, Oklahoma
Linguists of Russian
Writers from Beijing
20th-century American women educators
20th-century American educators
21st-century American women educators
21st-century American educators
Educators from Oklahoma
Women linguists